Byton may refer to:

 Byton, Herefordshire, a village in England, UK
 Bytoń (village), Bytoń Gmina, Radziejów County, Kuyavian-Pomeranian Voivodeship, Poland
 Gmina Bytoń (the gmina of Bytoń), Radziejów County, Kuyavian-Pomeranian Voivodeship, Poland
 Bytōń (Silesian name for Bytom), Silesian Voivodeship, Poland
 Byton (company), a Chinese automotive marque of Future Mobility Corporation

See also
 Bytown, Upper Canada, United Canadas, British North America
 Thomas Bytton
 Bitton
 Biton
 Ton (disambiguation)
 By (disambiguation)